Zhan may refer to:

Places
 Zhan, Kurdistan, an Iranian village in Kurdistan Province
 Zhan Rural District in Lorestan Province, Iran
 Zhan, Lorestan, a village in Zhan Rural District

Names
 Zhan (surname), several Chinese-language surnames

Given name
 Zhuge Zhan (227–263), Chinese politician
 Zhang Zhan (born 1983), Chinese lawyer and citizen journalist
 Gao Zhan (21st century), Chinese smuggler
 Zhan Videnov (born 1959), Prime Minister of Bulgaria
 Zhan Bush (born 1993), Russian/Israeli figure skater

See also 

 Zahn